The Peugeot Type 56 was a model from Peugeot for 1903.  It had a 0.8 L single-cylinder engine and had two rows of seats and an open top.  A total of 16 were built.

In 1904, after the model had been replaced, a Peugeot Type 56 gained official recognition for exceptional fuel economy when one of the cars traveled 100 kilometers using only 5.3 litres of fuel.   Recognition was awarded in the form of a gold medal called "la médaille d'or de la locomotion".

References
Histomobile on Type 56
Peugeot Car Models from 1889 to 1909

Type 56
Cars introduced in 1903
1900s cars
Veteran vehicles